State Road 970 (SR 970), also known as the Downtown Distributor, is a short  elevated freeway connecting Interstate 95 and Biscayne Boulevard in Downtown Miami. As of June 20, 2014, the entirety of the road cosigns with US 1/SR 5.

Route description
The expressway is two lanes wide in each direction, and had an annual average daily traffic volume of 34,000 according to a 2007 report, with an estimated volume of 37,500 in 2015.

In addition to the entrance and exit at US 1, SR 970 also has entrance and exit ramps at Miami Avenue, three blocks to the west. Eastbound drivers also can exit to SE 1st Avenue near the James L. Knight Center and the Miami Tower.

This route is mostly unsigned. On the Interstate, there is no recognition of the State Road status of the Downtown Distributor, as exit signs in both directions indicate "Biscayne Boulevard, US 1".

History
The Downtown Distributor opened simultaneously with the adjacent stretch of I-95 in 1968.

The freeway was to be the start of the Bayshore Loop around Downtown Miami in 1956, running along what is now U.S. Highway 1 and Interstate 395.

Exit list

References

External links

970
970
970
Transport infrastructure completed in 1968
State highways in the United States shorter than one mile
Freeways in the United States